Dorrha is a civil parish in the historical barony of Ormond Lower, County Tipperary, Ireland. It is located in the extreme north of County Tipperary and includes the settlement of Rathcabbin.

See also
 List of civil parishes of County Tipperary

References

Civil parishes of Ormond Lower